Gifford is a village in Champaign County, Illinois, United States. The population was 911 at the 2020 Census.

History
Gifford was laid out in 1876 and named for Benjamin F. Gifford. Along with nearby Penfield, the town had a station on the now-defunct Illinois Central Railroad. On August 9, 1894, a fire originating from the barbershop and billiard hall engulfed the entirety of the business district as well as the grain elevator, destroying both completely.

Gifford was heavily damaged by an EF3 tornado on November 17, 2013. The tornado struck shortly before 1:00 PM, destroying more than 20 homes and damaging 200 others. It took a diagonal path through the center of the village, and nobody was seriously injured.

Geography

Demographics

As of the 2020 census there were 911 people, 365 households, and 220 families residing in the village. The racial makeup of the village was 94.29% White, 0.55% African American, 0.22% Native American, 0.22% Asian, 0.66% from other races, and 4.06% from two or more races. Hispanic or Latino of any race were 1.87% of the population.

There were 365 households, out of which 46.58% had children under the age of 18 living with them, 49.32% were married couples living together, 7.95% had a female householder with no husband present, and 39.73% were non-families. 34.52% of all households were made up of individuals, and 19.73% had someone living alone who was 65 years of age or older. The average household size was 2.86 and the average family size was 2.28.

The village's age distribution consisted of 21.3% under the age of 18, 5.4% from 18 to 24, 16.6% from 25 to 44, 28.9% from 45 to 64, and 27.8% who were 65 years of age or older. The median age was 48.9 years. For every 100 females, there were 81.5 males. For every 100 females age 18 and over, there were 71.6 males.

The median income for a household in the village was $63,472, and the median income for a family was $80,625. Males had a median income of $50,568 versus $37,000 for females. The per capita income for the village was $34,517. About 3.2% of families and 5.2% of the population were below the poverty line, including 3.5% of those under age 18 and 2.3% of those age 65 or over.

Notable people

 Dennis J. Collins, Illinois state legislator and lawyer
 Michelle Franzen, television and radio journalist
 Michael Frerichs, Incumbent Treasurer of Illinois

References

Bibliography

Further reading

External links
 
 Official website

 
Villages in Champaign County, Illinois
Villages in Illinois